The 2013–14 season was a FK Pelister's 2nd consecutive season in First League. This article shows player statistics and all official matches that the club was played during the 2013–14 season.

Current squad
As of 29 January 2014

Competitions

First League

Results summary

Results by round

Results

Table

Macedonian Football Cup

First round

Second round

Quarter-final

Statistics

Top scorers

References

FK Pelister seasons
Pelister